Mark Stewart (October 14, 1889 – January 17, 1932), nicknamed "Big Stick", was a Major League Baseball catcher who played with the Cincinnati Reds in . He played only one game, and went hitless in one at bat.

External links

Cincinnati Reds players
1889 births
1932 deaths
Baseball players from Tennessee
Hopkinsville Hoppers players
Clarksville Volunteers players
Norfolk Tars players
Burials in Tennessee